1977–78 was the third season that Division 1 operated as the second tier of ice hockey in Sweden, below the top-flight Elitserien (now the Swedish Hockey League).

Division 1 was divided into four starting groups, based on geography.  The top four teams in the group would continue to the playoffs to determine which clubs would participate in the qualifier for promotion to Elitserien. The bottom one/two teams in each group were relegated to Division 2 for the 1978–79 season.

Regular season

Northern Group

Western Group

Eastern Group

Southern Group

Playoffs

North/West

First round 
 IF Björklöven - Strömsbro IF 2:0 (7:2, 2:1 OT)
 IFK Kiruna - Fagersta AIK 2:1 (3:0, 3:4, 5:1)
 Mora IK - Kiruna AIF 2:0 (5:2, 10:0)
 KB Karlskoga - Bodens BK 2:0 (7:3, 5:0)

Second round 
 IF Björklöven - KB Karlskoga 2:0 (11:3, 5:4)
 IFK Kiruna - Mora IK 2:0 (6:5, 5:3)

South/East

First round 
 Örebro IK - Nybro IF 2:1 (7:0, 3:6, 5:1)
 Huddinge IK - IFK Bäcken 2:0 (9:2, 7:2)
 Tingsryds AIF - Väsby IK 2:0 (7:3, 9:0)
 HV71 - Hammarby IF 1:2 (4:8, 4:1, 3:6)

Second round 
 Örebro IK - Hammarby IF 2:1 (3:5, 2:0, 4:3)
 Huddinge IK - Tingsryds AIF 2:0 (7:2, 8:5)

Elitserien promotion

External links
Historical Division 1 statistics on Svenskhockey.com

Swedish Division I seasons
2
Swe